Anthony James (born James Anthony; July 22, 1942 – May 26, 2020) was an American character actor who specialized in playing villains in films and television, many of them Westerns.

Early life
Anthony James was born James Anthony in Myrtle Beach, South Carolina, on July 22, 1942, as the only child of Greek immigrants George Anthony (1893–1951) and Marika Palla (1913–2008). He later reversed the order of his given name and surname for his acting career.

Career
James made several guest appearances on the Western series Gunsmoke during the series' run, appearing in different roles, most often playing the character of Elbert Moses. Other shows he has guest-starred on include Hawaii Five-O; The High Chaparral; Bonanza; The Rookies; Charlie's Angels; Starsky and Hutch; Buck Rogers in the 25th Century; Holmes & Yoyo; The A-Team; Hunter (1984); Quincy, M.E.; Star Trek: The Next Generation; and Beauty and the Beast; Married... with Children.

James also appeared in a number of major feature films. His first major role was as Ralph, the diner counterman in 1967's In the Heat of the Night.

His subsequent film appearances included P.J. (1968) and ...tick...tick...tick... (1970). He played one of the lynch mobsters in High Plains Drifter (1973), and also appeared as the evil chauffeur in the horror film Burnt Offerings (1976). He had roles in Blue Thunder (1983),  Nightmares (1983), and The Naked Gun 2½: The Smell of Fear (1991).

James also appeared in Poison's 1988 music video for their song "Fallen Angel." He retired from acting in the early 1990s, with his last film role in Clint Eastwood's 1992 Unforgiven, the Academy Award-winning film for Best Picture of 1992. It is notable that Anthony James's first and last major film appearances were each in Academy Award-winning films for Best Picture.

After retirement to Arlington, Massachusetts, he concentrated on painting. In 1994, he published a book of art and poetry, Language of the Heart. His autobiography, Acting My Face, was published in 2014.

Death
James died from cancer in Cambridge, Massachusetts, on May 26, 2020, at the age of 77.

Selected filmography

The Home-Made Car (1963) Boyfriend
In the Heat of the Night (1967) — Ralph
P.J. (1968) — Bartender-Assailant (uncredited)
Sam Whiskey (1969) — Cousin Leroy
...tick...tick...tick... (1970) — H.C. Tolbert
Vanishing Point (1971) — First Male Hitchhiker
The Culpepper Cattle Co. (1972) — Nathaniel
High Plains Drifter (1973) — Cole Carlin
The Teacher (1974) — Ralph Gordon
Hearts of the West (1975) — Lean Crook
Burnt Offerings (1976) — The Chauffeur
Victory at Entebbe (1976) — Gamal Fahmy
Return from Witch Mountain (1978) — Sickle
Texas Detour (1978) — Beau Hunter
The Fifth Floor (1978) — Derrick
Ravagers (1979) — Ravager Leader
Soggy Bottom, U.S.A. (1981) — Raymond
Wacko (1982) — Zeke
Blue Thunder (1983) — Grundelius
Nightmares (1983) — Store Clerk (segment "Terror in Topanga")
The A-Team (1985) — Connor
World Gone Wild (1987) — Ten Watt
Mortuary Academy (1988) — Abbott Smith
Slow Burn (1989) — Renzetti
The Naked Gun 2½: The Smell of Fear (1991) — Hector Savage
Unforgiven (1992) — Skinny Dubois (final film role)

References

External links

Interview with Anthony James – The Spectrum, March, 2016.

1942 births
2020 deaths
American male film actors
American male television actors
American painters
American people of Greek descent
Male actors from South Carolina
People from Myrtle Beach, South Carolina